The WIVB-TV Tower is a  guyed steel mast located at 8242 Center Street in Colden, New York, United States. The tower site was first used in 1948 by the Buffalo Evening News as the main broadcast tower for WIVB-TV (channel 4, the former WBEN-TV), now owned by Nexstar Media Group, who also owns the tower itself.

The tower is located in a farm field and fenced off near the entrance from Center Street. There are two towers on the site: a newer tower, and the older original 1948 structure.

WIVB temporarily left the tower site after 70 years in April 2018 when it entered into a channel-sharing agreement with sister station WNLO (channel 23) and sold its standalone digital channel allocation in the broadcast spectrum auction, transmitting for the next year from the WNED-TV (channel 17) tower in eastern Grand Island with WNLO while new tower construction took place to upgrade its television transmitter and antenna structure (WNLO transmitted from Grand Island since before the Western New York Public Broadcasting Association sold WNLO (then WNEQ) to WIVB's owners at the time, LIN Media, in 2001). It returned to the site in July 2019 after the two Nexstar stations both shifted to their new post-spectrum channel allocation, which also addressed the lack of signal range for Southern Tier viewers regarding both stations from Grand Island.

In addition to its longstanding use for WIVB, its former sister station, Audacy's WTSS (102.5, the former WBEN-FM) uses the site. WTSS is noted for being included in a grandfather clause allowing the station to transmit from the tower at 110,000 watts, more than double the otherwise allowable power for a station in the northeastern United States.

References

External links
 WIVB-TV Antenna Structure Registration record on FCC.gov
 WIVB-TV Tower at Skyscraperpage.com

Towers completed in 1948
Guyed masts
Towers in New York (state)
Radio masts and towers in the United States
1948 establishments in New York (state)
Buildings and structures in Erie County, New York